The Walther P99 is a semi-automatic pistol developed by the German company Carl Walther GmbH Sportwaffen of Ulm for law enforcement, security forces and the civilian shooting market as a replacement for the Walther P5 and the P88. The P99 and its variants are also made under licence by Fabryka Broni Radom.

History
Design work on this new generation sidearm began in 1994, and the handgun was presented in 1997 with series production commencing that same year. The weapon was first introduced chambered in 9×19mm Parabellum.

The pistol is used by the German Police in North Rhine-Westphalia and Rhineland-Palatinate and has been ordered by Bremen, Hamburg and Schleswig-Holstein, the Polish Police and the Finnish Army's special forces and military police, where it carries the designation PIST 2003 (Pistooli 2003). The Walther P99Q was also chosen in 2012 to replace older pistols and revolvers of the Finnish Police, Customs and Border Guard. This gun has also been chosen to replace the Walther P5 of the Dutch Police in 2013. In 2014 the Walther P99Q was also chosen to replace the Makarov PM of the Estonian Police and Border Guard Board. Walther announced the discontinuation of the P99 in early 2023

Product evolution
The Walther P99 was modified several times throughout its production history, as were the magazines. When the P99 was introduced the magazine capacities were 16 rounds for 9×19mm Parabellum and 12 rounds for .40 S&W. Magazines had witness holes on both sides. Later the magazine capacities were reduced to 15 rounds for 9×19mm Parabellum and 11 rounds for .40 S&W while witness holes were introduced at the rear of the magazine to view the loading condition.

Second generation models
Walther presented a redesigned second generation P99 in 2004, incorporating a modified trigger guard that eliminated the "ski hump", which is clearly visible in the accompanying first generation images. This was done to address user comfort concerns regarding the previous style. The first generation P99 pistols had a slide release at the left side of the frame while second generation guns may have optional ambidextrous slide stop release levers. Walther also took the opportunity to redesign the slide so the user could grip it more easily, and notably, change the proprietary accessory rail to a Weaver type.
Some models built in 2005 and all later models received one more design change, an elongated magazine release.

Design details

The Walther P99 is a short recoil-operated locked breech semi-automatic pistol that uses a modified Browning cam-lock system adapted from the Hi-Power pistol. The P99 has a glassfiber-reinforced polymer frame and steel slide assembly. It can be broken down into its main parts or field stripped with a take down catch without the help of tools.

It uses an internal striker as opposed to an external hammer, with a red-painted striker tip that protrudes from rear of the slide when the gun is cocked, as well as a loaded chamber indicator on the right side of the slide.

The original, first-generation P99 had a traditional Double-Action/Single-Action trigger with a decocker. When the slide is racked completely to the rear upon loading, the trigger remains in the forward position for the first shot and the Anti-Stress mode is activated, where the striker is cocked but the trigger has the length of pull of the double-action mode. At the end of the anti-stress travel, the pressure noticeably increases to 4.5 pounds and the user experiences a crisp trigger break and an extremely short trigger reset of about .1 inches. All subsequent shots are fired in standard single action mode, where the slack on the trigger is much shorter, but the point of release feels the same. In order to deactivate Single-Action or Anti-Stress mode, the user can manipulate the decocker button on the top of the slide, just in front of the rear sights. When decocked from Single-Action mode, the trigger will reset to the full length of its pull. The pistol is now in Double-Action mode with a pull 7.9 pounds for the full length of the .55 inch pull. After firing the first shot in Double-Action, the pistol will be fired in Single-Action for all subsequent shots.

The striker protrudes visibly and palpably from the back of the slide when the firearm is in a constant partially cocked state.
It should however be noted that the striker of the second generation P99QA variant does not protrude from the back of the slide, unless fired, as the firearm is in a constant partially cocked state.

Ergonomics were a key focus in the design of the firearm, and as a result, three interchangeable grip backstraps are included (small, medium and large)  to accommodate various hand shapes and sizes; this feature permits most shooters a comfortable and efficient grip on the firearm. This adaptable grip was innovative at the time the P99 was introduced.

The slide and other metal parts of the pistol are Tenifer treated (a nitriding process also used on Glock pistols). The Tenifer process produces a matte gray-colored, non-glare surface with a 64 Rockwell C hardness rating and a 99% resistance to salt water corrosion (which meets or exceeds stainless steel specifications), making the P99 particularly suitable for individuals carrying the pistol concealed as the highly chloride-resistant finish allows the pistol to better endure the effects of perspiration.

The P99 features four internal safeties, iron sights adjustable for both windage and elevation, tool-less take down, and an ambidextrous magazine release incorporated into the trigger guard. The lower forward edge of the frame also known as the dust cover has a mounting-bracket or rail interface system for attaching accessories, such as a tactical light or laser sight.

The P99 feeds from staggered-column or double-stack magazines of varying capacity.

The .40 S&W caliber models incorporate a slightly larger slide in order to preserve the same recoil spring assembly used in its 9mm counterpart. The P99 is available in 4 colorations; a black frame with a black slide, a black frame with a titanium-coated slide, a military olive-drab frame with a black slide, and a desert tan frame with black slide. All three of these finishes incorporate the same black grip inserts that come with every P99. The compact versions of the P99 are only available in all black.

Accessories
Fixed metal 3-dot iron sights, fixed tritium night sights, adjustable sports iron sights, adjustable optic fibre iron sights, laser pointers, tactical lights, magazine flashlight adapters, holsters, magazines, magazine loaders, grip extenders and a suppressor kit with a  barrel and protective cap for the muzzle threads and a silencer that reduces the sound signature by 33 dB(A) are offered as factory accessories.

Second generation variants

P99AS (Anti Stress)

Introduced in 2004, this variant comes closest to a traditional Double-Action/Single-Action trigger with a decocker. When the slide is racked completely to the rear upon (re)loading, the internal striker is manually pre-cocked to Single-Action mode and the trigger remains in the forward position for the first shot and the Anti Stress mode is activated. For manually deactivating the Anti Stress mode and setting the pistol to Double-Action mode the P99AS features a decocking button recessed into the top of the slide, rather than a conventional lever usually found on the side. The Anti Stress mode can also be manually activated by moving the slide approximately  back.

P99DAO (Double Action Only)
The P99DAO is similar to the previously produced P990 Double Action Only variant. The internal striker is at rest with no pre-load. The trigger pull is consistent in length and force from the first shot to the last and the striker returns to its de-cocked position after each shot.

P99QA (Quick Action)
This variant has a Glock style trigger system with a pre-loaded internal striker. When the trigger is pulled, the striker is fully cocked and released, firing the pistol. The trigger pull is consistent in length and force from the first shot to the last. The P99QA was announced in 2000 and discontinued in 2011.

P99c (Compact) versions
Compact versions of the P99 available in the 3 preceding action types marketed as the:
P99c AS (Compact Anti Stress)
P99c DAO (Compact Double Action Only)
P99c QA (Compact Quick Action)

Training variant

P99RAM (Real Action Marker)
The P99RAM is a training and simulation pistol, equipped with a CO2 blow-back system. It fires low-cost Paint- and Rubberball ammunition in caliber . In its design, controls, and handling, the P99RAM is indistinguishable from the original P99 pistol. Protective clothing is needed to adequately protect the users from Paint- and Rubberball hits during training.

Limited editions
Walther has also created several limited production runs of the P99 including:
MI-6 - 1st Generation P99, a marketing tie-in with the James Bond film series during Pierce Brosnan's tenure in the role.
Year 2000 - a limited edition P99 fabricated to commemorate the new millennium. 2000 of these were made to reciprocate the year for which it was issued.
P99 TA - a model prepared for the police tryouts in Baden-Württemberg in 2002, featuring a single/double-action trigger with redesigned trigger guard, center location ambidextrous decocker and an early ambidextrous slide catch as well as the removal of the "captured" accessory rail in favor of a standard "open" rail system. Lastly, this model has new contours on the lower frame just ahead of the disassembly clasp, just before the accessory rails to facilitate holstering. Approximately fifty (50) P99 TAs were produced with less than 25 sold to the public (10 imported to the U.S.).
Final Edition - it was announced in 2023 that Walther will release a limited edition version of the P99 titled the P99 AS Final Edition. The gun features a green frame and the engraving "Final Edition" on the slide and is otherwise functionally the same as the regular P99 AS.

Fabryka Broni Radom P99 RAD

The P99 RAD variant is made under license by Fabryka Broni Radom in Poland and marketed as a military sidearm proposition.

The P99 RAD grip shape and texture has been altered when compared to the P99 variants and an extended ambidextrous slide release and extended ambidextrous magazine release levers are fitted as a standard feature. Besides that the slide shape, dimensions and serrations have been altered. The standard sights are high-contrast 3 dot sights with contrast enhancements that have been painted with afterglow paint that can aid target acquisition under unfavourable lighting conditions. As an option the P99 RAD can also be fitted with self-luminous tritium night sights. The grip frame has an integrated mounting MIL-STD-1913 (Picatinny) rail for attaching tactical lights and laser sighting devices.

Many of the alterations found in the P99 RAD variant were applied in the Walther PPQ pistol introduced in 2011.

P99Q police pistol

Many of the alterations found in the Fabryka Broni Radom P99 RAD variant were also applied in the Walther P99Q pistol. The P99Q is a designated police pistol, which has been certified according to the Technical Specifications (TR) of the German Police (Technische Richtlinie Pistolen im Kaliber 9mm x 19, Revision January 2008). The P99Q is exclusively manufactured for German and foreign police departments and is not available on the civilian market. The P99Q has a partially pre-loaded internal striker trigger mechanism that conforms to the Technical Specifications (TR) of the German Police. When the trigger is pulled, the striker is fully cocked and released, firing the pistol. The trigger pull is consistent in length and force from the first shot to the last. This equals an accuracy of fire of ≤ 22 minute of angle (MOA) or ≤ 6.4 mrad. The grip frame has an integrated mounting MIL-STD-1913 (Picatinny) rail for attaching tactical lights and laser sighting devices.

Smith & Wesson SW99

The Smith & Wesson SW99 is a joint venture between Walther, who produces a modified receiver in Germany, and Smith & Wesson, who fabricates the slides and barrels in the United States. Magazines can be interchanged between the two models, but the pistols are considered to be two separate types, and are easily distinguished from each other by the trigger guard, grip and slide design. The SW99 is also available in .45 ACP, while the P99 is not. The P99 was developed and introduced prior to the SW99. Walther introduced a color-coding system to denote the difference between early generation SW99 and P99 magazines, with the latest generation being bright blue.

All 9mm P99s have always been completely German made. Some P99 .40 components are manufactured under license by S&W. The barrel, slide and frame of all 100% German-manufactured P99s bear an "Eagle over N" proof mark of the German Proof House at Ulm. The mark indicates the pistol was test-fired with a Proof Load; the "N" stands for nitrocellulose.

Magnum Research MR Eagle
The Magnum Research MR Eagle was another joint American/German venture, with Walther producing a black polymer frame with integral steel rails similar to the P99 series, only differing in grip texture and with the short magazine release paddles from the first gen P99. For its part, Magnum Research Inc. produced a 416 stainless steel slide and 4140 CrMo steel barrel in their Pillager, MN factory in the United States. The MR Eagle series pistols were available in 9×19mm Parabellum (MR9) and .40 S&W (MR40).

Users

: SPVM (City of Montréal Police Service)
: In 2014 the Estonian Police will be armed with the P99Q, as a replacement for the currently used Makarov pistol. As of March 2014 the P99Q is issued to the Police and Border Guard Board After just 2 years in service the Estonian Police and Border Guard have started replacing the Walther P99Q with a custom Glock 19 Gen 4 variant. This was due to issues with the P99Q malfunctioning during training and duty use. Up to 1000 Walther P99Q pistols are expected to remain in service during the transition period.
: Used by the Finnish Defence Forces as the PIST 2003 (Pistooli 2003). The Walther P99Q has also been chosen as the new personal handgun for police, customs and border guard personnel (7,800 pistols).
: 41,000 P99DAO pistols purchased in 2005 for the North Rhine-Westphalia Police. The State police of Rhineland-Palatinate procured approx. 10,000 units of the P99Q. The P99Q has also been ordered by the police forces of Hamburg (8,000 pistols), Bremen (2,000 pistols) and Schleswig-Holstein (8,000 pistols) with deliveries between 2009 and 2017.
: Garda Síochána; National Surveillance Unit (P99c), National Bureau of Criminal Investigation (P99c), Drugs and Organised Crime Bureau, Special Detective Unit, Garda Emergency Response Unit.
: Used by Special Task Unit "Tiger".
: The P99AS is the standard sidearm of the Royal Malaysia Police. (20,000 pistols).
: Since 2013 the Dutch police is armed with the P99Q, as a replacement for the Walther P5 (45,000 pistols).
: P99 AS/QA/DAO and domestic variant RAD are made by Łucznik Arms Factory. Police received around 80,000 units and ordered further 3,000.
 Polícia de Segurança Pública (PSP), Autoridade de Segurança Alimentar e Económica (ASAE), Grupo de Intervenção e Operações Especiais da GNR (GNR/GIOE)
: Used by the Special Forces of Police.
: Barcelona Municipal Police carry the Walther P99, Mossos d’Esquadra(Police of Catalonia)
: SBU
: Nottinghamshire Police armed specialist units used the P99DAO.

Gallery

See also
Walther P22, a rimfire pistol possessing similar styling and ergonomics chambered in .22 LR.
Walther PK380, a centerfire pistol also possessing similar styling and ergonomics with an overall size between the P22 and P99, but chambered in .380 ACP.

References

External links

P99 Semi-Automatic Pistols at Carl Walther Sportwaffen GmbH
Walther 2008 Defense Catalog
P99 Manual
Walther Arms P99
Walther P99 FAQ "Lenaburg Edition"
Ken Lunde's SIG Pro FAQ
Walther P99 at World Guns
Walther Forums

.40 S&W semi-automatic pistols
9×21mm IMI semi-automatic pistols
9mm Parabellum semi-automatic pistols
Police weapons
Post–Cold War weapons of Germany
Short recoil firearms
P99
Weapons and ammunition introduced in 1997